Biturix pellucida is a moth of the family Erebidae. It was described by Sepp in 1852. It is found in Mexico, Trinidad, Suriname and the Amazon region.

References

Phaegopterina
Moths described in 1852